Imadegawa Street (今出川通 いまでがわどおり Imadegawa Dōri) is a major street that crosses the city of Kyoto from east to west, running approximately 7 km from the gate of the Ginkaku-ji (east end) to the vicinity of the railway crossing west of the Tōjiin Ritsumeikan University Station (west end).

History 
Present day Imadegawa Street corresponds to the Kitakōji Street of the middle ages. The name of the street originates from the now non-existent Imadegawa River that used to run on the north side of the street until 1917.

Present Day 

Nowadays Imadegawa Street is located between Itsutsuji Street (north) and Motoseiganji Street (south), and is considered narrow for a major road. The street passes on the north side of the Kyoto Imperial Palace and for this reason, the northern gate of the garden receives the name of Imadegawa Gomon. Several universities are located along the street and for this reason its east section is considered a student district.

Relevant landmarks along the Street 

 Ginkaku-ji
 Jōdo-in
 Lake Biwa Canal
 Shirakawa River
 Yoshida Mountain
 Kyoto University
 Takano River
 Kamo River
 Kamo Ohashi Bridge
 Kyoto Imperial Palace
 Doshisha University
 Kyoto City Kamigyō Ward Office
 Nishijin Textile Center
 Kyoto City Archeological Museum
 Kamishichiken
 Kitano Tenmangū

Train Stations

Subway 

 Imadegawa Station

Keifuku Electric Railroad 

 Kitano-Hakubaichō Station
 Tōjiin Ritsumeikan University Station

External links 

 Ginkaku-ji
 Kyoto University
 Kyoto Imperial Palace
 Doshisha University
 Kyoto City Kamigyō Ward Office
 Nishijin Textile Center
 Kitano Tenmangū

References 

Streets in Kyoto